The following is a list of events relating to television in Ireland from 1978.

Events
January – The controversial secondary school drama The Spike goes on air. It was pulled from the schedule following a nude scene in Episode 5 which sparked criticism from Irish conservatives, and has never been retransmitted.
March – George T. Waters is appointed as Director-General of RTÉ.
2 November – Ireland's second television channel, RTÉ 2 goes on air. The opening night features a variety gala performance from the Cork Opera House and the 1968 film Bullitt.
6 November – The UK soap Coronation Street is aired for the first time on RTÉ 2. It had previously only been available to those who could receive UTV or HTV Wales.

Debuts

RTÉ 1
January – The Spike (1978)
29 April –  Fables of the Green Forest (1973)
11 September –  Hong Kong Phooey (1974–1975)
25 October –  The Clifton House Mystery (1978)
24 December –  Christmas Eve on Sesame Street (1978)

RTÉ 2
2 November – RTÉ News on Two (1978–present)
3 November –  The Upchat Line (1977)
3 November –  Armchair Thriller (1978–1980)
3 November –  The Voyage of Charles Darwin (1978)
4 November –  Rumpole of the Bailey (1975, 1978–1992)
4 November –  Mind Your Language (1977–1979)
4 November –  Sha Na Na (1977–1981)
4 November –  Bruce Forsyth's Big Night (1978, 1980)
6 November –  Coronation Street (1960–present)

Changes of network affiliation

Ongoing television programmes
RTÉ News: Nine O'Clock (1961–present)
RTÉ News: Six One (1962–present)
The Late Late Show (1962–present)
The Riordans (1965–1979)
Quicksilver (1965–1981)
Wanderly Wagon (1967–1982)
Hall's Pictorial Weekly (1971–1980)
Sports Stadium (1973–1997)
Trom agus Éadrom (1975–1985)
The Late Late Toy Show (1975–present)

Ending this year
Undated – The Spike (1978)

Births
5 May – Paul Byrne, broadcast journalist
31 October – Ella McSweeney, radio and television producer

See also
1978 in Ireland

References

 
1970s in Irish television